Janne Laakkonen (born April 15, 1982) is a Finnish professional ice hockey left winger currently playing for Fife Flyers in the UK's EIHL. Laakkonen most recently iced with fellow Elite League side Coventry Blaze.

Career
Laakkonen began his career with KalPa, playing for their junior teams before making his debut for the main roster during the 2000-01 Suomi-sarja playoffs. He then moved to SM-liiga team HPK and stayed for four seasons. He had a brief spell in Sweden's Elitserien for Timrå IK in 2005-06, playing six games and only registering one assist before moving back to Finland with HIFK.

In 2008, Laakkonen returned to HPK for a second spell. In 2010 he returned to KalPa for a second spell for one season before moving back to HPK in 2011 for a third spell with the team. For the 2012-13 season, he had spells in Mestis with Lempäälän Kisa and in the SM-liiga with Ilves before returning to Sweden with IF Sundsvall Hockey of the Hockeyettan, the country's third-tier league.

Since then, Laakkonen has played in various leagues across Europe. He played in the Kazakhstan Hockey Championship for Arystan Temirtau and Kulager Petropavl, the Supreme Hockey League in Russia for Yuzhny Ural Orsk, the Belarusian Extraleague for HK Neman Grodno, the Ligue Magnus in France for Gothiques d'Amiens and most recently for GKS Katowice of the Polska Hokej Liga in Poland.

On 14 August 2019, Laakkonen moved to UK Elite Ice Hockey League side Coventry Blaze on a one-year deal.

Laakkonen had originally expressed an interest in staying in Coventry for a second season, however following the suspension of the 2020-21 Elite League season, the winger moved to Austria in October 2020 to sign for AlpsHL side EHC Lustenau.

After eight games with Lustenau, Laakkonen transferred to Norwegian side Narvik IK in December 2020.

In March 2021, Laakkonen returned to Coventry Blaze ahead of the 2021 Elite Series. In July 2021, Laakkonen was then confirmed as a returnee for the 2021-22 Elite League season.

In July 2022, Laakkonen swapped Coventry for fellow Elite League side Fife Flyers, signing a one-year deal for the 2022-23 season.

Career statistics

References

External links

1982 births
Living people
Arystan Temirtau players
Coventry Blaze players
EHC Lustenau players
Fife Flyers players
Finnish ice hockey left wingers
GKS Katowice (ice hockey) players
Gothiques d'Amiens players
HIFK (ice hockey) players
HPK players
Ilves players
KalPa players
Kulager Petropavl players
Lempäälän Kisa players
Narvik IK players
HK Neman Grodno players
IF Sundsvall Hockey players
Timrå IK players
Yuzhny Ural Orsk players
People from Kuopio
Sportspeople from North Savo
Finnish expatriate ice hockey players in Scotland
Finnish expatriate ice hockey players in France
Finnish expatriate ice hockey players in Kazakhstan
Finnish expatriate ice hockey players in Belarus
Finnish expatriate ice hockey players in Austria
Finnish expatriate ice hockey players in Russia
Finnish expatriate ice hockey players in England
Finnish expatriate ice hockey players in Sweden
Finnish expatriate ice hockey players in Poland
Finnish expatriate ice hockey players in Norway